Arys, is a salt lake in Syrdariya District, Kyzylorda Region, Kazakhstan.

The waters of the lake are mineral-rich, averaging  and containing, besides sodium chloride, iodine, fluorine, bromine, boron, zinc, manganese and iron.

Geography
In the same manner as most lakes in the region, Arys is an endorheic lake which is fed by underground sources located near the shores or along the lake bottom.

Since 1968 Arys has completely dried up in the summer on a yearly basis.

See also
List of lakes of Kazakhstan

References

External links

Загадочное озеро пустыни Казасхстана (in Russian)

Lakes of Kazakhstan
Endorheic lakes of Asia
Kyzylorda Region